Vestfold County Municipality was the regional governing administration of the old Vestfold county in Norway. The county municipality was established in its most recent form on 1 January 1976 when the law was changed to allow elected county councils in Norway. The county municipality was dissolved on 1 January 2020, when Vestfold was merged with the neighboring Telemark county, creating the new Viken county which is led by the Viken County Municipality. The administrative seat is located in Tønsberg and the county mayor was Rune Hogsnes of the Conservative Party and the final chief administrative officer for the county municipality was Egil Johansen.

The main responsibilities of the county municipality included the running of the ten upper secondary schools with about 8,500 pupils in addition to Skiringssal Folk High School. It managed all the county roadways, public transport, dental care, culture, and cultural heritage sites in the county. Public transport was managed through Vestfold Kollektivtrafikk.

County government
The Vestfold county council was made up of 39 representatives that were elected every four years. The council essentially acted as a Parliament or legislative body for the county and it met several times each year. The council was divided into standing committees and an executive board which met considerably more often. Both the council and executive board were led by the County Mayor who held the executive powers of the county. The final county mayor was Rune Hogsnes.

County mayors
1964-1971: Torgeir Andersen (Conservative Party)
1972-1975: Harald Thaulow (Conservative Party)
1976-1991: Sverre Nordby (Conservative Party)
1992-2003: Ellen Gjerpe Hansen (Conservative Party)
2003-2005: Anne Rygh Pedersen (Labour Party)
2005-2007: Tove Lisbeth Vasvik (Labour Party)
2007-2014: Per-Eivind Johansen (Conservative Party)
2015-2019: Rune Hogsnes (Conservative Party)

County council
The party breakdown of the council is as follows:

References

 
County municipality
Organisations based in Tønsberg
County municipalities of Norway
1838 establishments in Norway
2020 disestablishments in Norway